Nina Pušlar (born October 25, 1988, in Ivančna Gorica, Slovenia) is a Slovenian singer-songwriter.

Biography
She won the contest Bitke talentov 2005 and released her debut album Nina Pušlar in 2006. She participated in Slovenian National Selection, EMA 2010 with the song "Dež", she reached second place in the final, but could not represent Slovenia in the Eurovision Song Contest. After the contest, she released her second album, Slečeno srce. She also participated in EMA 2011 with the song "Bilo lepo bi", but she could not qualify through to the final. Then she released her third album, Med vrsticami. In 2012, she participated in show "Slovenska popevka 2012" and reached second place with the song "Kdo še verjame". In 2013, she released her fourth album, Nekje vmes.

Discography

Studio albums 
 Nina Pušlar (2006)
 Slečeno srce (2010)
 Med vrsticami (2011)
 Nekje vmes (2013)
 #malodrugace (2015)

References 

1988 births
Living people
21st-century Slovenian women singers
People from Ivančna Gorica